Demchuk (written: Демчуҝ) is a Ukrainian surname. Notable people with the name include:

 Andrii Demchuk (born 1987), Ukrainian wheelchair fencer
 Andriy Demchuk (born 1974), Ukrainian weightlifter
 David Demchuk (born 19??), Canadian playwright and novelist
 Serhiy Demchuk (born 19??), Ukrainian paralympic swimmer

See also
 
 Demchok (disambiguation)
 Demchugdongrub (sometimes spelled Demchukdonrov), the leader of the Japanese puppet state of Mengjiang

Patronymic surnames
Ukrainian-language surnames